is a Japanese multinational electronics corporation that manufactures electronic components and recording and data-storage media. Its motto is "Contribute to culture and industry through creativity".

"TDK" is an initialism of the original Japanese name of the company: Tokyo Denki Kagaku Kōgyō K.K. (Tokyo Electric Chemical Industry Co., Ltd.). The company is listed on the Tokyo Stock Exchange and is a constituent of the Nikkei 225 and TOPIX indices.

History

TDK was founded by Kenzo Saito in Tokyo, Japan, on 7 December 1935 to manufacture the iron-based magnetic material ferrite, which had been recently invented by Yogoro Kato and Takeshi Takei. In 1952 and 1957, they began to produce magnetic tape, with compact cassette tapes following in 1966. TDK manufactured an extensive portfolio of magnetic and optical media, including several formats of videotape and blank CD-R and recordable DVD discs until the recording business was sold to Imation in 2007.

TDK produced five million ferrite cores through 1945 that were primarily used to reduce the volume and weight of radio receivers used by the Imperial Japanese military.

Operations in the US began in 1965 with a New York City office, and European operations began in 1970 with an office in Frankfurt, West Germany.

In 1980, TDK developed a multilayering technology to create chip capacitors and inductors used in personal computers, laptops, smartphones and other electronic devices.

In 1986, TDK acquired SAE Magnetics and introduced high-density recording heads.

In the 1990s, TDK's Mass Storage Division included brushless DC spindle motors, magnetoresistance (MR) heads and thin-film heads.

Since 1997, TDK has gradually withdrawn from the production of compact cassettes. First with the MA-X and AR ("Acoustic Response"), then the AD ("Acoustic Dynamic") and SA-X line in 2001 and 2002 respectively, then the MA ("Metal Alloy") line in 2004. The SA ("Super Avilyn") and D ("Dynamic") lines were withdrawn in 2011. Industry trends see the company moving into new forms of media. In 2004 TDK was the first media manufacturer to join the companies developing BD post-DVD technology. 
TDK operated a semiconductor division in California for about a decade, but divested it in 2005.

In late 2007, Imation acquired marketing and sales operations for TDK brand recording media, including flash media, optical media, magnetic tape, and accessories, for $300 million. This also included a license to use the "TDK Life on Record" brand on data storage and audio products for 25 years. In September 2015, Imation announced that it had agreed to relinquish this license and would cease selling TDK-branded products by the end of the year.

Since the 2000s, TDK has focussed on the development, manufacture and sales of electronic components, HDD heads and suspension, and power supplies.

Beginning in 2005, TDK has acquired many types of electronic device manufacturers including passive component developers, sensors manufacturers and power supply companies. These areas remain TDK's focus today.

Since acquiring numerous companies and sharpening its product line focus in recent years, TDK has begun building a portfolio of varying sensors, actuators and power electronic components through these brands. These include multi-axis MEMS motion tracking devices and MEMS microphones from InvenSense, a point-of-load DC-DC converter from Faraday Semi, and MEMS-based ultrasonic Time-of-Flight sensors from Chirp Microsystems intended for consumer electronics, AR/VR, robotics, drones, IoT, automotive and industrial market segments. Other areas of TDK's recent focus include power components for mobile devices, high-stability MEMS accelerometers from Tronics, and miniaturized haptic actuators.

Since 2016, Shigenao Ishiguro has been President and CEO of TDK.

In 2017, TDK and GenCell began collaborating to develop and produce an ammonia-based fuel solution.

Key acquisitions and joint ventures
1986:	SAE Magnetics (H.K.) Ltd., a magnetic head maker based in Hong Kong
2000:	Headway Technologies, a magnetic head maker based in the United States
2005:	Amperex Technology Limited, a Lithium Polymer battery company based in Hong Kong
2005:	Lambda Power Division, a group of power supply businesses of London-based Invensys PLC.
2008:	Epcos, an electronic device manufacturer based in Germany
2016:	Hutchinson Technology Inc., a manufacturer of HDD suspension assemblies based in the United States
2017:	RF360 Holdings Singapore PTE Ltd. – a joint venture with Qualcomm Inc. (USA)
2017:	ICsense NV, a mixed-signal ASIC design & supply company based in Belgium
2017:	InvenSense, Inc., a sensor specialist based in the United States
2018:	Chirp Microsystems, a developer of low power, ultrasonic 3D-sensing solutions based in the United States
2018:	Faraday Semi LLC, a developer of miniature Point of Load (PoL) solutions based in the United States

Sponsorship and advertising

TDK has sponsored the IAAF World Championships in Athletics since the 1983 inaugural event in Helsinki.

TDK sponsored Ajax for several years in the 1980s during which it won UEFA Cup Winners' Cup in 1987. From 1993 to 1999, TDK were also the sponsors of the English football club Crystal Palace, who were promoted to the Premier League twice during this era, though lasting for just one season before being relegated on both occasions. TDK was also a minor sponsor of the Brisbane Broncos Rugby League Team during the early 1990s. It is a current sponsor of the IAAF World Championships in Athletics. It also sponsors activities and events such as those at The Cross nightclub in Central London, and it had a prominent sign at Piccadilly Circus from 1990. The contract for this sign was terminated in 2015, as TDK was moving away from consumer electronics.

TDK has owned a sign on One Times Square since 2000. The screen is placed under that of Toshiba and can be seen during the annual Times Square New Year's Ball Drop.

Since 2001, TDK has supported performances of some of the world's distinguished orchestras in Japan within the company's "TDK Orchestra Concerts" program. TDK's "Outreach-Mini Concerts" and "Special Rehearsals and Main Concert Invitations" additionally serve as avenues for the company to attract younger audiences.
TDK's own football club, based in Nikaho, Akita, recently split from the corporation to become independent football club Blaublitz Akita, with the aim for the professional leagues.

Museum

TDK operates a company museum in Nikaho, Akita, Japan. The museum is open to the public, free of charge. Among its exhibits are a comprehensive history of the company, its products and technologies, and emerging developments.

TDK products

References

External links

 
 Official Global Website
 TDK US Website
 TDK India Website
 The TDK history museum

TDK
Engineering companies based in Tokyo
Manufacturing companies based in Tokyo
Electronics companies established in 1935
Companies formerly listed on the London Stock Exchange
Companies listed on the Tokyo Stock Exchange
Electronics companies of Japan
Japanese brands
Video game companies of Japan
Defense companies of Japan
Capacitor manufacturers
Japanese companies established in 1935
1960s initial public offerings